Automata are self-operating machines.

Automata may also refer to:

Computing
 Cellular automata, a discrete model studied in computability theory and other disciplines
 Von Neumann cellular automata, the original expression of cellular automata
 Automata theory, the study of abstract machines
 Automata UK, a former software house

Arts and entertainment
 "The Automata", an 1819 short story by E. T. A. Hoffmann
 "Automata", a 1929 short story by S. Fowler Wright
 Autómata, a 2014 science-fiction film
 Nier: Automata, a 2017 video game
 Automata, an alternative title of The Devil's Machine, a 2019 British horror film directed by Lawrie Brewster

See also
 Automat (disambiguation)
 Automatic (disambiguation)
 Automaton (disambiguation)